Sturminster Marshall is a village and civil parish in the east of Dorset in England, situated on the River Stour between Blandford Forum and Poole. The parish had a population of 1,895 at the 2001 census, increasing to 1,969 at the 2011 Census and includes the village of Almer west of Sturminster Marshall, near Winterborne Zelston and the hamlet of Henbury to the south-east of the village. The village is twinned with the French commune of Sainte-Mère-Église in Normandy. The appropriate electoral ward is called 'Stour'. From Sturminster Marshall the ward goes east to Pamphill, with a total population of 2,582.

King Alfred the Great, in his will of 899, a copy of which can be seen at the British Library, left the village to his youngest son Æthelweard (c.880-922).

Sturminster Marshall has a 13th century church, St. Mary's. Its predecessor contributed to the village's name; 'Sturminster' meaning "church on the River Stour". The second part of the name came from William Marshall. Until 1857, St. Hubert's Church in Corfe Mullen acted as a chapel of ease to Sturminster Marshall. St. Mary's pre-reformation chalice, dating to 1536, has survived although the stem has been replaced. It is on loan to Dorset County Museum.

Village amenities
Sturminster Marshall has a playing field with a children's playground in one corner. Nearby is the Memorial Hall which offers a meeting-space for many village societies. There is also an old school hall which is also used as a meeting-space.

There are many walks around the village including the Stour Valley Way, which follows the Stour right from the source to the sea.

The village has two pubs: the Red Lion within the village and the Golden Fox on the outskirts.

The village has a cricket club with a side in Dorset division 3. There is also a football club with a senior side and several junior teams.

References

External links 

2001 Census data
SMYFC

Villages in Dorset